Edward Little (1773–1849) was an attorney and philanthropist who founded Edward Little High School in Auburn, Maine.

Little's father, Josiah, was a descendant of one of the first settlers of what is now Auburn, Maine. Edward Little was born in 1773 in Newbury, Massachusetts, and attended Phillips Exeter before graduating from Dartmouth College in 1798. Little eventually became a successful attorney and entrepreneur in the city of Newburyport, but after a devastating fire in 1811 he moved to Portland, Maine, several years later, and then in 1826 he moved to what is now Auburn. After his father's death in 1830, Little inherited land in the Auburn area. Little was known as "a quiet, scholarly person who was known for his devotion to the community." Little made many prominent donations, including the donation of a Congregational church building to Bowdoin College, and in 1834 he founded the Lewiston Falls Academy, donating 9 acres (3.6 ha) and considerable funds to the academy, which was later named the Little Institute and then Edward Little High School. Edward Little lived in the Edward Little House and died in 1849.

References

External links
Edward Little High School

1773 births
1849 deaths
Philanthropists from Maine
American educators
People from Auburn, Maine
People from Newburyport, Massachusetts
Lawyers from Portland, Maine
Maine lawyers
19th-century American lawyers